Mykola Anatoliyovich Dovhan (born 15 July 1955), known as Mykola Dovhan or Nikolai Dovgan, is a Ukrainian rower who competed for the Soviet Union in the 1976 Summer Olympics and in the 1980 Summer Olympics.

In 1976, he finished fifth in the single sculls event.

Four years later he was a crew member of the Soviet boat which won the silver medal in the quadruple sculls competition.

References 
  "full name: Mykola Anatoliyovych Dovhan, other name: Nikolay Anatolyevich Dovgan"
 
 

1955 births
Living people
Russian male rowers
Ukrainian male rowers
Soviet male rowers
Olympic rowers of the Soviet Union
Rowers at the 1976 Summer Olympics
Rowers at the 1980 Summer Olympics
Olympic silver medalists for the Soviet Union
Olympic medalists in rowing
World Rowing Championships medalists for the Soviet Union
Medalists at the 1980 Summer Olympics